Munki is the sixth studio album released by Scottish rock band The Jesus and Mary Chain. After leaving Blanco y Negro, the Reid brothers signed to Sub Pop in the U.S. and Creation, who had released their debut single "Upside Down" in 1984, in the UK. The origin of the album title, according to Ben Lurie in an interview with Spin magazine, was that they "wanted an un-Mary Chain-like title...It doesn't mean anything. It's just a word. Misspelled on purpose." In an interview with The Herald, Jim said that their sister Linda suggested it. This was the band's final studio album before their 8-year breakup from October 1999 to June 2007.

The album features an appearance from Hope Sandoval of Mazzy Star, who had previously duetted with the band on the single "Sometimes Always", and includes the singles "I Hate Rock 'n' Roll" (released in 1995), "Cracking Up" and "I Love Rock 'n' Roll".

The album is often thought of as sounding "divided" due to the Reids' crumbling relationship, as Jim Reid recalled: "Me and William weren't really getting along at all. That last year we barely even spoke. Munki is one of my favorite albums, but it was really divided. William would go into the studio with the rest of the band and record while I wasn't there, and then I'd go in with them when William wasn't there."

According to an interview in Alternative Press magazine, Jim said that "I Hate Rock 'n' Roll" was written by his brother "out of sheer frustration with the kind of crap we have to deal with in the music business." To counterbalance these sentiments, Jim wrote "I Love Rock 'n' Roll" because "I thought it left [Munki] kind of negative - I felt it was only half the story."  In the same issue of Alt Press, Munki was rated a perfect 5 out 5.  Most other reviews, like those from AllMusic and Rolling Stone, were less enthusiastic.

Munki peaked at No. 47 in the UK album charts, the band's first studio album not to make the Top 40.

Track listing

Double-LP (CRELP 232 / SP 426)
Disc one – Side A
"I Love Rock 'n' Roll" (Jim Reid) – 2:37
"Birthday" (William Reid) – 3:57
"Stardust Remedy" (J. Reid) – 2:26
"Fizzy" (W. Reid) – 3:39

Disc one – Side B
"Moe Tucker" (J. Reid) – 3:19
"Perfume" (W. Reid) – 4:39
"Virtually Unreal" (J. Reid) – 3:38
"Degenerate" (W. Reid) – 5:29

Disc two – Side A
"Cracking Up" (W. Reid) – 4:40
"Commercial" (W. Reid) – 7:02
"Supertramp" (J. Reid) – 3:37
"Never Understood" (W. Reid) – 4:14

Disc two – Side B
"I Can't Find the Time for Times" (W. Reid) – 4:17
"Man on the Moon" (J. Reid) – 3:41
"Black" (W. Reid) – 5:18
"Dream Lover" (J. Reid) – 3:05
"I Hate Rock 'n' Roll" (W. Reid) – 3:42

CD (CRECD 232 / SPCD 426)
"I Love Rock 'n' Roll" (J. Reid) – 2:37
"Birthday" (W. Reid) – 3:57
"Stardust Remedy" (J. Reid) – 2:26
"Fizzy" (W. Reid) – 3:39
"Moe Tucker" (J. Reid) – 3:19
"Perfume" (W. Reid) – 4:39
"Virtually Unreal" (J. Reid) – 3:38
"Degenerate" (W. Reid) – 5:29
"Cracking Up" (W. Reid) – 4:40
"Commercial" (W. Reid) – 7:02
"Supertramp" (J. Reid) – 3:37
"Never Understood" (W. Reid) – 4:14
"I Can't Find the Time for Times" (W. Reid) – 4:17
"Man on the Moon" (J. Reid) – 3:41
"Black" (W. Reid) – 5:18
"Dream Lover" (J. Reid) – 3:05
"I Hate Rock 'n' Roll" (W. Reid) – 3:42

Personnel

The Jesus and Mary Chain
 Jim Reid – vocals (tracks 1, 2, 3, 5, 7, 10, 11, 13, 14, 16), guitar, production
 William Reid – vocals (tracks 4, 6, 8, 9, 12, 15, 17), guitar, production
 Ben Lurie – guitar, bass
 Nick Sanderson – drums

Additional personnel
 Sister Vanilla – vocals (track 5)
 Sean Lebon – vocals (track 5)
 Hope Sandoval – vocals (track 6)
 Terry Edwards – horns
 Dick Meaney – mixing (tracks 1 to 7, 9 to 12, 14, 16, 17)
 Alan Moulder – mixing (tracks 8, 13, 15)
 Nick Addison – additional mixing (track 6)

References

The Jesus and Mary Chain albums
1998 albums
Sub Pop albums
Creation Records albums